Cha Kum-Chol (born July 19, 1987) is a North Korean weightlifter.
His personal best combined lift is 283 kg.

At the 2007 World Championships he became world champion in the 56 kg category.

He competed in weightlifting at the 2008 Summer Olympics in the 56kg division, where he equalled his personal best to finish fifth.

Cha represents the April 25 Sports Team.

Notes and references

External links 
 NBC profile 
 Athlete Biography at beijing2008

North Korean male weightlifters
1987 births
Living people
World Weightlifting Championships medalists
Weightlifters at the 2008 Summer Olympics
Olympic weightlifters of North Korea
Asian Games medalists in weightlifting
Weightlifters at the 2006 Asian Games
Weightlifters at the 2010 Asian Games
Asian Games silver medalists for North Korea
Medalists at the 2010 Asian Games
Universiade medalists in weightlifting
Universiade silver medalists for North Korea
Medalists at the 2013 Summer Universiade
21st-century North Korean people